Alan Newman may refer to:
 Alan Newman (baseball)
 Alan Newman (entrepreneur)

See also
 Allan Patterson Newman, American criminal and serial killer